Coptostomabarbus bellcrossi is a species of cyprinid in the genus Coptostomabarbus that inhabits Zambia.

References

Cyprinidae
Fish of Zambia
Cyprinid fish of Africa